is a former Japanese football player. He played for TDK and FC Gifu before retirement.

Club statistics

References

External links

1979 births
Living people
Association football people from Yamagata Prefecture
Japanese footballers
J2 League players
Japan Football League players
Blaublitz Akita players
FC Gifu players
Association football midfielders